The Kızıldere Geothermal Power Plant is a geothermal power plant located at Kızıldere village of Sarayköy district in Denizli Province, southwestern Turkey. The initial power plant with 
15 MW installed capacity was expanded in the second phase about 80 MW to 95 MW in total, making the facility Turkey's biggest geothermal power plant. It is planned to expand the power plant in a third and fourth phase.

History
The power plant began its operation as a prototype system with the installation of a 500 kW turbine generator group in 1974. The facility generated electricity and distributed it to the households of villages in the vicinity for four years free of charge. In 1984, the state-owned company Elektrik Üretim A.Ş. (EÜAŞ) built a power plant with 17.4 MW installed capacity and put it into service. However, the geothermal power plant has produced 10 MW on average since its opening in 1984.

In September 2008, Zorlu Energy Inc. (Zorlu Doğal Elektrik Üretim A.Ş.), a subsidiary of Zorlu Holding, acquired the facility from Ankara Doğal Elektrik Üretim ve Ticaret A.Ş. (ADÜAŞ) as part of a privatisation process with seven other hydroelectric power plants across the country. Zorlu Energy Inc. obtained the operating lease right for a runtime of 30 years. The company announced that they increased the actual power capacity from 6 MW to 14 MW in three months, and added that they plan to raise the capacity to 60 MW within three years in the next phase.

With the initiative of the governmental Electrical Power Resources Survey and Development Administration (EIE), a research project was started by Zorlu Petrogas Oil &Gas group. After the oil and gas assets were sold to Transatlantic Petroleum, the project was carried out by Zorlu Geothermal Company in cooperation with the Hacettepe University and the Middle East Technical University (ODTÜ) to increase the electricity production from the geothermal field.

For the investment capital of the planned capacity increase, which amounts to US$230 million, the company received a credit from the banks Akbank and Garanti Bank in October 2010 with a backpayment term of 12 years.

In December 2011, the provincial administration allocated  land needed for the construction site of the geothermal power plant expansion. The project forecast 575 GWh annual electrical energy generation, and a contribution to the country's economy at US$60 million yearly. The geothermal fluid would be used also in dry ice production and for heating in greenhouses and households in the villages around the power plant.

The construction of the Kızıldere Geothermal Power Plant was completed in 2013, and it went into service. On September 29, 2013, a ceremonial opening took place in presence of Prime Minister Recep Tayyip Erdoğan, Minister Energy and Natural Resources Taner Yıldız, other high-ranked politicians and officials. The construction cost US$250 million.

Kızıldere Geothermal Reservoir
Kızıldere geothermal field is situated at the western branch of Büyük Menderes Graben within the limits of Denizli Province. It is Turkey's first and high-potential geothermal field explored for energy generation purposes.

The first geological and geophysical surveys in the Kızıldere geothermal field began in 1965, and were carried out by the state-owned Turkish Mineral Research and Exploration Co. (MTA). Six of the 17 geothermal wells were found feasible for electricity generation.

Lithologically, the Kızıldere geothermal reservoir is surrounded by marble and limestone rocks containing plentiful carbon dioxide. The calcium carbonate dissolves from the rocks and later gets deposited as limescale on the instruments in the geothermal well and at the brink, such as demisters, heat exchangers, and other locations, and this causes a drop in pressure. This results in decreased steam production, reduced efficiency, and an increased probability of failure. Thus, the power plant capacity was reduced to 6 MW before privatization in 2008. To prevent calcium carbonate scaling in production wells, inhibitors are used.

The geothermal fluid of Kızıldere reservoir has a Langelier Saturation Index (LSI) of 2.1 and Ryznar Stability Index (RSI) of 2.3 by a pH value of 9.3, making scaling take place very rapidly.

All the geothermal fluid used in the power plant is reinjected into the reservoir for the purpose of maintaining the sustainability of the source.

Byproducts
In addition to electricity generation, the geothermal fluid serves for processing of carbon dioxide gas as a byproduct, and this is used in dry ice production at two nearby plants. The total annual dry ice production in Kızıldere is 80,000 tons. Further applications are heating of  greenhouse space and 2,500 households.

Honors
In June 2011, the International Energy and Environment Fair and Conference (ICCI) awarded Zorlu Energy Inc. the 2010 Energy Prize for its works on renewable energy, particularly in relation to the Kızıldere GEPP and Gökçedağ Wind Farm.

References

Geothermal power stations in Turkey
Buildings and structures in Denizli Province
Sarayköy District
Industrial buildings completed in 2013
21st-century architecture in Turkey